Albert Lewis Fletcher (October 28, 1896 – December 6, 1979) was an American prelate of the Roman Catholic Church. He served as bishop of the Diocese of Little Rock in Arkansas from 1946 to 1972.  He previously served as an auxiliary bishop of the same diocese from 1939 to 1946.

Biography

Early life 
Albert Fletcher was born in Little Rock, Arkansas, to Thomas and Helen (née Wehr) Fletcher. His parents were both converts to Catholicism; his father was originally an Episcopalian and his mother a Lutheran. He and his family moved to Paris, Arkansas, a few months after his birth, then to Tontitown and Mena, both in Arkansas. In 1912, Fletcher entered Little Rock College, obtaining a Bachelor of Arts degree in chemistry in 1916.

Priesthood 
After completing his theological studies at St. John Home Missions Seminary, Fletcher was ordained to the priesthood for the Diocese of Little Rock by Bishop John Morris on June 4, 1920. He then served as an assistant professor of chemistry and biology at Little Rock College, where he became president in 1923. In 1922 he earned a Master of Science degree from the University of Chicago. 

Fletcher was professor of dogmatic theology and canon law at St. John Seminary (1925–1929), and chancellor (1926–1933) and vicar general (1933–1946) of the diocese. He was named a papal chamberlain in 1929 and a domestic prelate in 1934.

Auxiliary Bishop and Bishop of Little Rock 
On December 11, 1939, Fletcher was appointed auxiliary bishop of the Diocese of Little Rock and titular bishop of Samos by Pope Pius XII. He received his episcopal consecration on April 25, 1940, from Archbishop Amleto Cicognani, with Bishops Jules Jeanmard and William O'Brien serving as co-consecrators. He was the first native Arkansan to become a Catholic bishop, and his was the first consecration to be held in that state.

Fletcher was named bishop of Little Rock by Pius XII on December 7, 1946. He was a staunch advocate of desegregation, supporting the U.S. Supreme Court's ruling in Brown v. Board of Education in 1954, and reprimanding Governor Orval Faubus for attempting to prevent desegregation at Little Rock Central High School in 1957. In a 1960 publication entitled "An Elementary Catholic Catechism on the Morality of Segregation and Racial Discrimination", Fletcher described segregation as "immoral ... unjust and uncharitable", and stated that it could even constitute mortal sin "when the act of racial prejudice committed is a serious infraction of the law of justice or charity".

From 1962 to 1965, Fletcher attended the Second Vatican Council in Rome. Although he inaugurated the liturgical use of the vernacular in his diocese as early as 1964, he did not follow the council's advice on creating permanent deacons, and closed St. John Seminary after some of its faculty publicly questioned the Church's stance on birth control and papal infallibility. The anti-communist Fletcher was also opposed to calling for an end to American participation in the Vietnam War and to giving amnesty for those who resisted the war and avoided the draft.

Retirement and legacy 
On July 4, 1972, Pope Paul VI accepted Fletcher's resignation as bishop of the Diocese of Little Rock. Albert Fletcher died in Little Rock on December 6, 1979, at age 83. He is buried in the crypt of St. Andrew's Cathedral.

References

External links
Diocese of Little Rock
Fletcher in The Encyclopedia of Arkansas History & Culture

1896 births
1979 deaths
Roman Catholic bishops of Little Rock
20th-century Roman Catholic bishops in the United States
Participants in the Second Vatican Council
American civil rights activists
Activists from Arkansas